The Civil Aviation Affairs is the civil aviation authority of the Kingdom of Bahrain, headquartered in Building 702 in Hidd on Muharraq island.

As a subsidiary of the Ministry of Transportation and Telecommunications, it is responsible for all air transportation activities within the country. These responsibilities include issuing licenses, permits, airline schedules. Additionally, the CAA is responsible for providing Bahrain with meteorological services such as weather forecasts.

Directorates
There are seven directorates that make up the CAA, as of October 2019:
Aeronautical Licensing
Air Navigation Systems
Air Traffic Management
Air Transport
Aviation Security
Aviation Safety and Security
Meteorology

See also

 Bahrain International Airport
 Bahrain Airport Company
 Gulf Air
 Gulf Air Flight 72 
 Bahrain Air

References

External links
 Civil Aviation Affairs - Ministry of Transportation
 Civil Aviation Affairs (Archive)
 Civil Aviation Affairs  (Archive)
 Civil Aviation Affairs at Bahrain Airport (Archive)

Government agencies of Bahrain
Bahrain
Civil aviation in Bahrain
Transport organisations based in Bahrain